Dulag may refer to:

Macliing Dulag, an assassinated Filipino indigenous peoples' rights activist
Dulag, Leyte, a municipality in the Philippines
Dulag or Durchgangslager, the German term for a prisoner transit camp

See also